The Terror of the Sea is a 1924 German silent film directed by Franz Osten and starring Carl de Vogt, Helena Makowska, and Cläre Lotto.

The film's sets were designed by the art director Max Heilbronner. It was shot at the Emelka Studios in Munich.

Cast

References

Bibliography

External links

1924 films
Films of the Weimar Republic
German silent feature films
Films directed by Franz Osten
German black-and-white films
Bavaria Film films
Films shot at Bavaria Studios
1920s German films